"Riverman" is a song by the English rock band Noel Gallagher's High Flying Birds. It was written and produced by Noel Gallagher. The track was released on 11 May 2015 as the third single from the band's second studio album Chasing Yesterday (2015).

Track listing

Charts

Weekly charts

References

2015 singles
Noel Gallagher's High Flying Birds songs
Songs written by Noel Gallagher
Song recordings produced by Noel Gallagher
2015 songs